Gorbatovsky is a rural locality (a khutor) and the administrative center of Gorbatovskoye Rural Settlement, Serafimovichsky District, Volgograd Oblast, Russia. The population was 364 as of 2010. There are 5 streets.

Geography 
Gorbatovsky is located 68 km southwest of Serafimovich (the district's administrative centre) by road. Gorbatov is the nearest rural locality.

References 

Rural localities in Serafimovichsky District